Charles Hamilton Eglee (born November 27, 1951) is an American film and television screenwriter and producer. He worked extensively for Steven Bochco productions throughout the 1990s. For Bochco productions he co-created Byrds of Paradise with frequent collaborator Channing Gibson and co-created Murder One with Gibson and Bochco. Eglee co-created the series Dark Angel with James Cameron.

He was a writer and executive producer on The Shield and Dexter. He served as a member of the production team behind the adaptation of The Walking Dead.

Biography

Eglee was born in Boston, Massachusetts, and grew up in North Haven, Connecticut and Eastham, Massachusetts. He was graduated cum laude from Williston Academy and received his B.A. in English from Yale University. After a brief stint teaching film history at Yale, Eglee moved to California and worked for Roger Corman, where he served in a variety of production capacities and met then production designer James Cameron. With Cameron, Eglee wrote Piranha II: The Spawning. Later, he wrote and produced the mutant rodent film Deadly Eyes.

In 1984, Eglee joined the writing staff of St. Elsewhere as story editor. He went on to become writer and supervising producer of the ABC series Moonlighting. At Twentieth Century Fox Television, Eglee co-wrote and executive-produced the one-hour television pilot, Rockenwagner.

Joining Steven Bochco Productions in 1991, Eglee wrote and co-executive produced the ABC series Civil Wars for two seasons, during which time he also wrote for L.A. Law. In 1993, he co-created and executive-produced the short-lived ABC series, The Byrds of Paradise, starring Timothy Busfield, Seth Green and Jennifer Love Hewitt. After the show's ending, Eglee joined NYPD Blue during its second season, as writer and co-executive producer. In 1995, he co-created Murder One with Steven Bochco and was the show's executive producer. Again with Bochco, Eglee co-created and executive-produced Total Security for ABC starring James Belushi and James Remar.

Eglee and James Cameron teamed up again to co-create Dark Angel, a futuristic drama starring Jessica Alba, set in a dystopic world of 21st-century Seattle.

In 2003, Eglee joined the crew of FX police drama The Shield as an executive producer.

In 2007, Eglee joined Showtime drama series Dexter as a writer and executive producer for the third season. He remained a writer and executive producer for the fourth season in 2009.

In 2010, he was a writer and executive producer for the first season of the television adaptation of The Walking Dead, which reunited him with The Walking Dead series creator and showrunner Frank Darabont who had directed an episode of the sixth season of The Shield.

Eglee served as showrunner for the third and final season of American Gods.

Filmography

Film

Television
Production staff

Writer

Awards
1995: Emmy Award - Outstanding Drama Series for NYPD Blue
1997: BAFTA - Best Foreign Drama for Murder One
2001: People's Choice Award - Favorite New Drama Series for Dark Angel
2004: AFI - TV Program of the Year for The Shield
2006: Peabody Award for The Shield
2008: AFI - TV Program of the Year for The Shield

References

External links
 

Film producers from Massachusetts
1951 births
Living people
Williston Northampton School alumni
Yale College alumni
American male screenwriters
American television writers
Writers from Boston
People from North Haven, Connecticut
People from Eastham, Massachusetts
Television producers from Massachusetts
American male television writers
Screenwriters from Massachusetts
Screenwriters from Connecticut
Film producers from Connecticut
Television producers from Connecticut